Star for Life (previously known as Star School) is a Swedish non-profit school programme that was created in Southern Africa to prevent HIV/AIDS from spreading. The idea was formed by the Swedish entrepreneur Dan Olofsson and his wife Christin. Their goal was to help young African people actualize their dreams and to support them to live an AIDS-free life by refraining from having unsafe sex.

Over 60,000 youths are educated in the prevention of HIV/AIDS by Star for Life in South Africa and Namibia. These youths are students at the 62 schools run by Star for Life there. The first school was started in the autumn of 2005 in the South African province KwaZulu-Natal. Olofsson paid for the expenses (15 million kronor) of this school by himself; the rest of the schools were paid for by sponsors. A fund was created for the programme and, as of 2008, 55 million kronor had been raised from donations by various Swedish company leaders such as Stefan Persson (H&M) and Volvo.

Alf Svensson, one of the people behind Star for Life, has commented on the advice given to youths by the programme: "It's either safe sex or no sex at all. The results have been fantastic. We have lowered the amount of teen pregnancies significantly."

The school programme lasts three years and uses colours, art, music, and sports as important parts of the education. They also work with strengthening the school children's self-esteem through coaching and support. Many South African youths have been given the opportunity to travel to Sweden to perform at concerts to raise money for the programme. These concerts help the youths to strengthen their esteem. The Swedish band Triple & Touch has done several concerts with African youths to support Star for Life. In addition to music, several football teams have been created in Africa.

Star for Life has received support from Mandla Mandela, Nelson Mandela's grandson, who helped raise money for the project when he came to Sweden in late 2009. The Star for Life logo appeared on the front of the professional football club Malmö FF's shirts during the 2009 Allsvenskan season.

Olofsson received a Global Business Coalition award in 2008 for Star for Life. Among the 700 guests at the award ceremony were Secretary-General of the United Nations Ban Ki-moon, who praised the programme.

References

External links
 Official website

HIV/AIDS prevention organizations
Educational organisations based in Namibia
Medical and health organisations based in South Africa